Khatyn-Sysy (Xatıŋ Sıhıı) is a rural locality (a selo) and the administrative center of Tarkayinsky Rural Okrug of Nyurbinsky District in the Sakha Republic, Russia,  from Nyurba, the administrative center of the district. Its population as of the 2002 Census was 789.

References

Notes

Sources
Official website of the Sakha Republic. Registry of the Administrative-Territorial Divisions of the Sakha Republic. Nyurbinsky District. 

Rural localities in Nyurbinsky District